Motoplex Speedway and Event Park, formerly known as SunValley Speedway, was a paved tri-oval auto racing facility located in Spallumcheen, north of Vernon, British Columbia, Canada.  The facility features a 7,500-seat,  NASCAR-sanctioned tri-oval. There are also hot pits for 38 cars, 105 polished cement pit stalls, and a  campground with elevated motor home parking. In 2010, the venue began being used for other events including concerts.

The last event was held in 2015 due to legal actions, and the owners have applied to rezone the property for industrial use.

NASCAR Canadian Tire Series events

References

External links
 Official site
Motoplex Speedway race results at Racing-Reference

Sport in Vernon, British Columbia
Paved oval racing venues in Canada
Motorsport venues in Canada
Motorsport venues in British Columbia
NASCAR tracks
CASCAR
2000 establishments in British Columbia
Sports venues completed in 2000